Eureka is an unincorporated community in Pennsylvania, United States on the border of Warrington Township in Bucks County and Montgomery Township in Montgomery County. Eureka is at the intersection of Pennsylvania Route 152 and County Line Road.

References

Unincorporated communities in Bucks County, Pennsylvania
Unincorporated communities in Montgomery County, Pennsylvania
Unincorporated communities in Pennsylvania